The Wine Group is an American alcoholic beverage company founded in 1981, and based in Livermore, California.

Products
It produces wine brands including Franzia, Cupcake Vineyards, Benziger Family Winery, Chloe Wine Collection, 7 Deadly Wines, Imagery Estate Winery, Concannon Vineyard, and Almaden Vineyards. As of 2008, the company was the world's third-largest wine producer. As of 2018, the company became the second-largest U.S. wine company, producing 53 million cases annually

List of notable brands

Franzia
Cupcake Vineyards
Chloe Wine Collection
7 Deadly Wines
Benziger Family Winery
Imagery Estate Winery
Tribute Wines
Mogen David (makers of MD 20/20)
Almaden Vineyards
Concannon Vineyard
Hope Tree

Controversy
In March 2021, The Wine Group was found to have breached multiple spam and telemarketing laws in Australia

See also

 List of California companies
 List of U.S. beverage companies

References

1981 establishments in California
Food and drink companies established in 1981
Drink companies based in California
Companies based in Livermore, California
Wineries in California
American companies established in 1981